Justin Pierre (born 13 September 1981) is a Caymanian footballer who plays as a forward. He has represented the Cayman Islands at full international level.

References

Association football forwards
Living people
1981 births
Caymanian footballers
Cayman Islands international footballers
George Town SC players